The National Clonal Germplasm Repository is a branch of the 
Agricultural Research Service research agency of the United States Department of Agriculture (USDA). The Repository is a gene bank that preserves genetic resources by various means, including cryopreservation. There are nine clonal repositories located in appropriate locations throughout the United States.  Germplasm of citrus plants and dates are preserved in Riverside, California, a distribution center for grapes, temperate fruit, walnut, almond and pistachio nuts is located in Davis, California, and the repository for temperate small fruit, berries, pears, hazelnut, butternut and specialty crops is located in Corvallis, Oregon.  The base gene bank for the USDA National Germplasm System is the National Center for Germplasm Preservation at Ft. Collins, CO.   This center holds seeds of agronomic crops, cryopreserved clonal plant materials, animal, and bacterial germplasm.

See also
 Germplasm Resources Information Network

References

Agricultural organizations based in the United States
United States Department of Agriculture agencies